Orchid tree is a common name for several tree species, including:

In the genus Bauhinia:
Bauhinia blakeana
Bauhinia forficata
Bauhinia monandra
Bauhinia purpurea
Bauhinia variegata
In other genera:
Amherstia nobilis
Magnolia champaca, yellow jade orchid tree
Monodora tenuifolia